Different Directions  is the 25th studio album by American singer-songwriter John Denver released in September 1991.  Notably, three of the album's nine songs were written by Joe Camilleri and Nick Smith, and initially recorded by The Black Sorrows on their 1988 album Hold On to Me.

Track listing

Side one
 "Potter’s Wheel" (Bill Danoff)
 "Ponies" (Jeffrey Hawthornee Bullock)
 "The Foxfire Suite, Spring Is Alive, You Are…, Whisper the Wind, Spring Is Alive (Reprise)" (Denver)
 "Chained to the Wheel" (Joe Camilleri, Nick Smith)

Side two
 "Two Different Directions" (Denver)
 "Hold On To Me" (Joe Camilleri, Nick Smith)
 "The Chosen Ones" (Joe Camilleri, Nick Smith)
 "Amazon (Let This Be a Voice)" (Denver)
 "Tenderly Calling" (Jan Camp Garrett)

Personnel
John Denver – vocals, guitar
James Burton – guitar
Jerry Scheff – bass
Glen D. Hardin – keyboards
Jim Horn – saxophone, flute

References

John Denver albums
1991 albums